Fergus Burke (born 3 September 1999 in New Zealand) is a New Zealand rugby union player who plays for the  in Super Rugby. His playing position is fly-half. He has signed for the Crusaders squad in 2020.

Reference list

External links
 

1999 births
New Zealand rugby union players
Living people
Rugby union fly-halves
Canterbury rugby union players
Crusaders (rugby union) players